The 1983 NBL Finals was the postseason tournament of the National Basketball League's 1983 season, which began in February. The finals began on 23 June. The tournament concluded with the Canberra Cannons defeating the West Adelaide Bearcats in the NBL Grand Final on 4 July.

Format
The NBL finals series in 1983 consisted of the divisional finals (which was a round-robin fixture for the top eight teams), two semi-final games, and one championship-deciding grand final. The finals were contested between the top eight teams of the regular season, with the final four weekend split between two Melbourne venues – Burwood Stadium and Kilsyth Stadium.

Qualification

Qualified teams

Ladder

The NBL tie-breaker system as outlined in the NBL Rules and Regulations states that in the case of an identical win–loss record, the results in games played between the teams will determine order of seeding.

Divisional Finals

|- bgcolor="#CCCCFF" font size=1
!width=90| Date
!width=180| Home
!width=60| Score
!width=180| Away
!width=70| Box Score

Round Robin (East)

Round Robin (West)

Results

Bracket

Semi-finals

|- bgcolor="#CCCCFF" font size=1
!width=90| Date
!width=180| Home
!width=60| Score
!width=180| Away
!width=70| Box Score

Grand Final

|- bgcolor="#CCCCFF" font size=1
!width=90| Date
!width=180| Home
!width=60| Score
!width=180| Away
!width=70| Box Score

See also
 1983 NBL season

References

Finals
National Basketball League (Australia) Finals